The Craft Council of British Columbia (CCBC) is a non-profit, charitable arts service organization working with fine craft professionals and local, provincial and national arts organizations to promote the development of excellence in crafts. Since 1972, CCBC has been making craft more significant in the cultural life of British Columbians and Canadians. Through CCBC's public gallery and retail shop on Granville Island, CCBC Shop & Gallery, exhibitions have showcased contemporary objects in ceramic, glass, fibre, metal and wood that honour innovation in art, craft and design.

Programs 
The CCBC offers a number of programs and services designed to promote fine crafts, educate the public on fine craft practices and trends, meet the needs of its membership, craftspeople/artisans, educators, students and the general public. The CCBC is the only craft-focused arts service organization in BC that fulfills an educational and public mandate along with regional and national objectives.

A list of programs currently offered at CCBC:
 Craft Vignettes, a community-based crafts program providing demonstrations and educational sessions 
 Small Business Round-table seminars, providing resources and guidance to craftspeople at various stages of their careers
 Mentorships for professionals and students; the program pairs individuals of the same media together for a period of 5 months.  Mentee is guided by artisan level mentor in the skills-building capacity, either on existing work or new work.

Highlights and achievements 
  the signature "Made by Hand" exhibitions showcasing the best in fine crafts that started in 1976 until the late 1990s.
  partnership with the Canadian Crafts Federation to produce the largest-ever crafts festival throughout Canada, Craft Year 2007, and presenting a province-wide exhibition (90 artists) and related programming with the Roundhouse Community Arts and Recreation Centre and Vancouver Museum.
  collaborating with CCF and other provincial craft councils on an Asian trade mission to the Cheongju International Craft Biennale 2007 and preparing for Canada Pavilion in 2009, South Korea and Vancouver 2010 Winter Olympics.
   branding and marketing BC's fine crafts to an international audience and including crafts as value-added attractions to draw more audiences to Vancouver and BC.

History 

The CCBC, formerly the Craft's Association of British Columbia was created in recognition of a growing craft community in British Columbia by interested members of the Visual Arts Committee of the Community Arts Council of Vancouver. The first CCBC office, resource centre and exhibition space was located in the Dominion Building at the corner of Hastings and Cambie Street, downtown Vancouver. The Council continues to foster the development of craftspeople and fine craft through a variety of programs at its present location, 1386 Cartwright Street on Granville Island.

British Columbia's leading craftspeople 

Glass - Joanne Andrighetti, Gary Bolt, Lou Lynn, Markian Olynyk, Naoko Takenouchi, Morna Tudor

Wood - Neno Catania, Ron David, Jason Marlow, Todd Stockner

Ceramic - Walter Dexter, Robin Hopper, Sadashi Inuzuka, Charmian Johnson, Sam Kwan, Vincent Massey, Kinichi Shigeno, Debra Sloan

Fibre - Jane Kenyon, Lesley Richmond, Carol Sabiston, Ruth Scheuing, Joanna Staniszkis, Yvonne Wakabayashi

Metal - Madeleine Chisholm, Barbara Cohen, Erin Dolman

References

Non-profit organizations based in Vancouver
Arts organizations based in Canada
Crafts organizations